St Edmund's Catholic Academy is a Roman Catholic secondary school and sixth form with academy status located in the Compton area of Wolverhampton, West Midlands England. The Building Schools for the Future program invested £7.9 million of its £300 million budget into improving the school. A further £5 million was contributed by Wolverhampton Wanderers Football Club and Redrow Homes, which used parts of the site to create a training ground and new homes, respectively. The new school building was completed in September 2013.

The name of the school comes from the influence of St. Edmund Campion (1540 – 1581), an English Jesuit priest and martyr. Its motto is "To Love and Serve the Lord".

Consortium
St. Edmund's is in a consortium with both St Peter's Collegiate Academy and Wolverhampton Girls' High School. St. Edmund's has links with its feeder schools:
St. Anthony's (in Fordhouses)
St. Bernadette’s (in Wombourne)
St. Christopher’s (in Codsall in Staffordshire)
SS Peter and Paul
SS. Mary & John’s
St. Michael’s (in Penn)
St. Teresa’s (in Parkfields)

References

External links
St Edmund's Catholic Academy official website

Secondary schools in Wolverhampton
Academies in Wolverhampton
Catholic secondary schools in the Archdiocese of Birmingham